Kiyú – Ordeig is a coastal resort in the San José Department of southern Uruguay. The name Kiyú is often used to refer to the whole resort.

Geography
Another road, also 15 kilometers long, starts on Route 1 at Puntas de Valdez and ends slightly west of the resort.

Population
In 2011, Kiyú-Ordeig had a population of 423.
 
Source: Instituto Nacional de Estadística de Uruguay

References

External links
INE map of Kiyu-Ordeig

Populated places in the San José Department
Seaside resorts in Uruguay